{{Infobox Twitch streamer
| name = xChocoBars
| image = Twitchcon 2017 xChocoBars.jpg
| image_size = 170px
| caption = Xu at TwitchCon 2017
| logo = 
| logo_size = 
| logo_caption = 
| birth_name = Janet Rose Xu
| birth_date = 
| birth_place = Toronto, Ontario, Canada
| death_date = 
| death_place = 
| nationality = Canadian
| occupation = 
| home_town = 
| education = 
| website = 
| pseudonym = 
| channel_name = xChocoBars
| years_active = 2015–present
| genre = Gaming
| games = {{flatlist| 
League of Legends 
Fortnite 
Teamfight Tactics
Valorant
Minecraft
Among Us}}
| followers = 940,105
| views = 51 million
| associated_acts = 
| module = 
| location = 
}}
Janet Rose Xu (born November 5, 1994), better known as xChocoBars, is a Canadian Internet personality and Twitch streamer. 

 Career 
Xu started livestreaming on Twitch in May 2013 and creating videos on YouTube in November 2013. In her early years, she was most well known for her gameplay and commentary of League of Legends, Fortnite, and Teamfight Tactics. Her fans are affectionately called the Potato Army.

In 2018, Xu was one of the four captains of an $100,000 League of Legends esports charity tournament alongside Pokimane, LilyPichu, and Kaypea. Xu played Fortnite with NBA player Josh Hart in IGN's Fortnite Streamer Showdown later that year.

Xu has also taken part in professional esports. In 2019, she won first place at Twitch Rivals: League of Legends tournament as part of team EZ Clap. She went on to participate in ESPN’s inaugural Apex Legends EXP Pro-Am tournament.

She was a finalist for the Twitch Streamer of the Year award at the 11th Shorty Awards.

In 2020, Xu began to stream and post videos of her playing Among Us'' with many other streamers and celebrities including Valkyrae, Disguised Toast, dakotaz, Hafu, Sykkuno, Corpse Husband, Pokimane, Bretman Rock, and more.

Personal life 
Xu was born in Toronto, Canada. She was studying to obtain an early childhood education degree when she dropped out to pursue streaming full time. Xu formerly lived with other streamers Pokimane, Valkyrae, and Starsmitten from mid-2020 to June 2021.

In 2020, Xu publicly spoke out about her experience dealing with a severe stalker for over two years. "I often think about how I will prob die by the hands of my stalker and no one can do anything about it until it really happens," she tweeted. "I know it’s heavy to talk about but if it does happen I hope my death will mean something and help protect other creators from similar situations."

Awards and nominations

References 

1994 births
Canadian YouTubers
Gaming YouTubers
Living people
Twitch (service) streamers
Women esports players
YouTube channels launched in 2013